The Wellington Botanic Garden in Wellington, New Zealand covers 25 hectares of land on the side of the hill between Thorndon and Kelburn, near central Wellington.

The garden features 25 hectares of protected native forest, conifers, plant collections and seasonal displays.  It also features a variety of non-native species, including an extensive Rose Garden.  It is classified as a Garden of National Significance by the Royal New Zealand Institute of Horticulture. In 2004 it was listed as an historic area with Heritage New Zealand.

The Wellington Cable Car runs between Lambton Quay and the top of the Botanic Garden, and it is the most direct way to get from the top part of the garden to Wellington's Central Business District. The winding hill paths of the Garden are a popular spot for Wellington residents.  It is used for walking, jogging and taking children to the playground, and tourists enjoy meandering through the Garden's many collections via the downhill path to the city.

The Gardens feature a large Victorian-style glasshouse, the Begonia House, the Lady Norwood Rose Garden and the Treehouse Visitor Centre.  There is a large children's play area, a duck pond, and glowworms visible some nights along paths in the Main Garden – there are monthly tours during autumn–spring (the Garden is otherwise closed at night). Large sculptures and carvings are located throughout the garden.  These are by artists such as Henry Moore, Andrew Drummond, Mary-Louise Browne, Regan Gentry, Denis O'Connor and Chris Booth.

The Wellington City Council organises events during spring and summer months, such as free concerts in the Sound Shell.

The Wellington Botanic Garden is home to several organisations, including:
Carter Observatory, the National Observatory of New Zealand
Wellington Cable Car Museum
Meteorological Service of New Zealand

History
The Garden was established in 1868. It was initially managed by the New Zealand Institute (later named the Royal Society Te Apārangi) and its manager James Hector until 1891. The New Zealand Institute planted conifers as part of a programme to import plant species and assess their potential for economic benefit to New Zealand. The first Map of the Garden in 1875 by John Buchanan also included the compilation of a list of all plants growing there, and a survey of native plants indigenous to the Reserve.

Some animals were kept at the Botanic Gardens prior to the formation of Wellington Zoo in Newtown in 1906, this included the "City Emu" which died shortly after being relocated to the Zoo from the Gardens.

The Wellington City Council began managing the garden in 1891, developing various parts of the garden such as:

 Lady Norwood Rose Garden (1950)
 Begonia House (1960)
 Treehouse Visitor Centre (1990) in conjunction with the World Wildlife Fund

Gallery

References

External links 

Botanic Garden Visitor Information
Wellington Gardens website

Botanical gardens in New Zealand
Tourist attractions in Wellington City
Protected areas of the Wellington Region
Heritage New Zealand historic areas in the Wellington Region
Parks in Wellington City